A steakhouse, steak house, or chophouse refers to a restaurant that specializes in steaks and chops, found mainly in North America. Modern steakhouses may also carry other cuts of meat including poultry, roast prime rib, and veal, as well as fish and other seafood.

History
Chophouses started in London in the 1690s and served individual portions of meat, known as chops. The traditional nature of the food served was zealously maintained through the later 19th century despite the new cooking styles from the Continent, which were becoming fashionable. The houses were normally only open for men.

The steakhouse started in the United States in the mid-19th century as a development from traditional inns and bars. Steakhouses can be casual or formal fine dining restaurants.

The oldest chophouse in London, Simpson's Tavern is regarded as an institution of London and retains its 19th century decor. The oldest continuously operating steakhouse in the United States is the Old Homestead Steakhouse in New York City, established in 1868. Prior to that there were chophouses in New York City such as Cobweb Hall, owned by David Pattullo, which was known for its mutton chops and offered additional menu options such as beefsteaks, lamb kidneys, bacon, and potatoes.

Today, steakhouses are found throughout the USA.

See also 

 Café de Paris sauce
 Churrascaria
 List of steakhouses
 Seafood restaurant
 Steak frites

References 

 
Restaurants by type